Asano Shigeakira (December 2, 1743 – January 4, 1814) was a Japanese daimyō of the Edo period, who ruled the Hiroshima Domain.

Family
 Father: Asano Munetsune
 Mother: Izumi no Kata
 Wives:
 Tokugawa Kunihime (1736–1767), daughter of Tokugawa Munekatsu, 8th Daimyo of Owari Domain
 Tokugawa Yokohime (1751–1773), daughter of Tokugawa Munekatsu of Owari Domain
 Children:
 Iwamatsu by Kunihime
 Asano Narikata by Yokohime
 Mori Hayatsu (1769–1801) of Mikazuki Domain
 Asano Nagatoshi
 Asano Nagatomo
 Asano Samumaru
 Katsuko married Mizuno Tadamitsu of Karatsu Domain
 Koki-in married Nanbu Toshitaka of Morioka Domain
 daughter married Ito Hirotami of Obi Domain
 daughter married Asano Nagakata
 daughter married Akimoto Chikatomo
 daughter married Ogasawara Nagateru

References 

1743 births
1814 deaths
Daimyo
Asano clan